The United States special presidential envoy for climate is a position in the Executive Office of the President of the United States with authority over energy policy and climate policy within the executive branch.  It is currently held by John Kerry, who is the inaugural envoy.

History

On November 23, 2020, President-elect Joe Biden announced former U.S. Secretary of State John Kerry, would serve as the Special Presidential Envoy for Climate and would be a member of the United States National Security Council (NSC).

The term "Climate Czar" has been used to informally describe Kerry's position. There had been one previous climate policy advisor in the White House, Carol Browner, who was director of the now-defunct White House Office of Energy and Climate Change Policy from 2009 to 2011.  In particular, the new position will be the first time that the NSC would have an official dedicated to climate change issues and to addressing the climate crisis as one affecting national security.

Foreign visits

April 2021: Envoy John Kerry became the first senior official of the Biden administration to visit China. Discussed issues included the recent decision by Japan to dump radioactive water of the Fukushima nuclear plant into the Pacific.

List of Envoys

See also
 White House National Climate Advisor

References

Executive Office of the President of the United States
Energy policy of the United States
Climate change policy in the United States
 
2021 establishments in the United States
Presidency of Joe Biden